Kotly is the name of several rural localities in Russia.

Modern localities
Kotly (settlement at the railway station), Leningrad Oblast, a settlement at the railway station in Kotelskoye Settlement Municipal Formation of Kingiseppsky District in Leningrad Oblast; 
, a village in Kotelskoye Settlement Municipal Formation of Kingiseppsky District in Leningrad Oblast; 
Kotly, Oryol Oblast, a village in Krasnensky Selsoviet of Zalegoshchensky District in Oryol Oblast;

Alternative names
Kotly, alternative name of Kotelki, a village in Bogdanovsky Rural Okrug of Urzhumsky District in Kirov Oblast;

Abolished localities
Kotly, Moscow, a former rural locality whose territory is now located in southern Moscow